is a Japanese professional footballer who plays centre-back or left-back Singapore Premier League for Hougang United.

Career

In 2012, he joined JEF United Chiba after completing his university.  

In 2014, he joined Machida Zelvia on loan. 

In 2016, he joined Montedio Yamagata for more playing time. 

He moved to Ehime FC in 2021   initially on loan before making the move permanent in 2022.    He was released at the end of the season.

Club statistics
Updated to end of 2022 season.

References

External links
Profile at Montedio Yamagata

1990 births
Living people
Senshu University alumni
Association football people from Shizuoka Prefecture
Japanese footballers
J2 League players
J3 League players
Singapore Premier League players
JEF United Chiba players
FC Machida Zelvia players
Montedio Yamagata players
Ehime FC players
Hougang United FC players
Association football defenders